The Apostolic Church of Queensland is an Australian Christian denomination. It was founded  in Queensland, Australia, by H. F. Niemeyer and took its current name in 1911.

The church's logo is a 4R-symbol. The four "R"s stand for: RIGHT - ROYAL - RIGHTEOUS - RICH:
 RIGHT according to the bible
 ROYAL as the Bride to have membership with Christ
 RIGHTEOUS in partaking of the body and blood of Christ
 RICH in the promises Christ gave to his apostles

References

Further reading

External links 
 Official website

Catholic Apostolic Church denominations
Christian denominations in Australia
1883 establishments in Australia